Appucutty Sivasunderam (born 2 October 1904) was a Ceylon Tamil politician and Member of Parliament.

Sivasunderam was born on 2 October 1904.

Sivasunderam stood as the Illankai Tamil Arasu Kachchi's (Federal Party) candidate in Kilinochchi at the March 1960 parliamentary election. He won the election and entered Parliament. He was re-elected at the July 1960 parliamentary election. He contested the 1970 parliamentary election as an independent candidate but was defeated by the All Ceylon Tamil Congress candidate V. Anandasangaree.

References

1904 births
Illankai Tamil Arasu Kachchi politicians
Members of the 4th Parliament of Ceylon
Members of the 5th Parliament of Ceylon
People from Northern Province, Sri Lanka
People from British Ceylon
Sri Lankan Tamil politicians
Year of death missing